The 2023 Boston Pizza Cup, the provincial men's curling championship for Alberta, was held February 8 to 12 at the River Cree Resort and Casino in Enoch, Alberta. The winning Kevin Koe rink represented Alberta at the 2023 Tim Hortons Brier in London, Ontario where after placing second in Pool A with a 7–1 record, they lost in the Championship round semifinal to Ontario 9–8.

Additionally, two other rinks qualified for the Brier as wild card teams based on CTRS standings. The Brendan Bottcher rink was the Wild Card #1 representative while the Karsten Sturmay rink was the Wild Card #3 representative. The Bottcher rink would end up with a bronze medal finish losing to eventual runner-up Manitoba in the semifinal 7–5. The Sturmay rink finished sixth in Pool B with a 3–5 record.

Qualification process

Teams
The teams are listed as follows:

Knockout brackets

Source:

A event

B event

C event

Knockout results
All draw times are listed in Mountain Time (UTC-07:00).

Draw 1
Wednesday, February 8, 1:00 pm

Draw 2
Wednesday, February 8, 6:30 pm

Draw 3
Thursday, February 9, 9:00 am

Draw 4
Thursday, February 9, 2:00 pm

Draw 5
Thursday, February 9, 7:00 pm

Draw 6
Friday, February 10, 8:30 am

Draw 7
Friday, February 10, 1:00 pm

Draw 8
Friday, February 10, 5:00 pm

Draw 9
Saturday, February 11, 11:00 am

Playoffs
Source:

A vs. B
Saturday, February 11, 7:00 pm

C1 vs. C2
Saturday, February 11, 7:00 pm

Semifinal
Sunday, February 12, 10:00 am

Final
Sunday, February 12, 3:00 pm

References

External links

2023 in Alberta
Curling in Alberta
2023 Tim Hortons Brier
February 2023 sports events in Canada
Sport in Edmonton